Uvulars are consonants articulated with the back of the tongue against or near the uvula, that is, further back in the mouth than velar consonants.  Uvulars may be stops, fricatives, nasals, trills, or approximants, though the IPA does not provide a separate symbol for the approximant, and the symbol for the voiced fricative is used instead. Uvular affricates can certainly be made but are rare: they occur in some southern High-German dialects, as well as in a few African and Native American languages. (Ejective uvular affricates occur as realizations of uvular stops in Lillooet, Kazakh, or as allophonic realizations of the ejective uvular fricative in Georgian.) Uvular consonants are typically incompatible with advanced tongue root, and they often cause retraction of neighboring vowels.

Uvular consonants in IPA
The uvular consonants identified by the International Phonetic Alphabet are:

Descriptions in different languages

English has no uvular consonants (at least in most major dialects), and they are unknown in the indigenous languages of Australia and the Pacific, though uvular consonants separate from velar consonants are believed to have existed in the Proto-Oceanic language and are attested in the modern Formosan languages of Taiwan. Uvular consonants are, however, found in many Middle-Eastern and African languages, most notably Arabic and Somali, and in native American languages. In parts of the Caucasus mountains and northwestern North America, nearly every language has uvular stops and fricatives. Two uvular R phonemes are found in various languages in northwestern Europe, including French, some Occitan dialects, a majority of German dialects, some Dutch dialects, and Danish.

It is pronounced somewhat like the voiceless velar stop , but with the middle of the tongue further back on the velum, against or near the uvula.

, the uvular ejective, is found in Ubykh, Tlingit, Cusco Quechua, and some others.

Few languages use this sound, but it is found in Persian and in some Northeast Caucasian languages, notably Tabasaran, and Pacific Northwest, such as Kwakʼwala. It may also occur as an allophone of another uvular consonant. In Kazakh, the voiced uvular stop is an allophone of the voiced uvular fricative after the velar nasal.

The voiceless uvular fricative  is similar to the voiceless velar fricative , except that it is articulated near the uvula.

Uvular flaps have been reported for Kube (Trans–New Guinea) and for the variety of Khmer spoken in Battambang province.

The Enqi dialect of the Bai language has an unusually complete series of uvular consonants consisting of the stops /q/, /qʰ/ and /ɢ/, the fricatives /χ/ and /ʁ/, and the nasal /ɴ/. All of these contrast with a corresponding velar consonant of the same manner of articulation. The existence of the uvular nasal is especially unusual, even more so than the existence of the voiced stop.

The Tlingit language of the Alaska Panhandle has ten uvular consonants, all of which are voiceless obstruents:

And the extinct Ubykh language of Turkey has twenty.

Phonological representation
In featural phonology, uvular consonants are most often considered to contrast with velar consonants in terms of being [–high] and [+back]. Prototypical uvulars also appear to be [-ATR].

Two variants can then be established. Since palatalized consonants are [-back], the appearance of palatalized uvulars in a few languages such as Ubykh is difficult to account for. According to Vaux (1999), they possibly hold the features [+high], [-back], [-ATR], the last being the distinguishing feature from a palatalized velar consonant.

Uvular rhotics 

The uvular trill  is used in certain dialects (especially those associated with European capitals) of French, German, Dutch, Portuguese, Danish, Swedish and Norwegian, as well as sometimes in Modern Hebrew, for the rhotic phoneme.

As with most trills, uvular trills are often reduced to a single contact, especially between vowels.

Unlike other uvular consonants, the uvular trill is articulated without a retraction of the tongue, and therefore doesn't lower neighboring high vowels the way uvular stops commonly do.

Several other languages, including Inuktitut, Abkhaz, Uyghur and some varieties of Arabic, have a voiced uvular fricative but do not treat it as a rhotic consonant. However, Modern Hebrew and some modern varieties of Arabic also both have at least one uvular fricative that is considered non-rhotic, and one that is considered rhotic.

In Lakhota the uvular trill is an allophone of the voiced uvular fricative before .

See also
Uvularization
Place of articulation
List of phonetics topics
Guttural R
Retracted vowels

Notes

References
 
 

Place of articulation